Tommy Tutone 2 is the second album by rock band Tommy Tutone, released in 1981. It features its biggest hit, "867-5309/Jenny". The first two albums by the band were re-released by the Collectable label as a two-albums-on-one-CD release in 1997. John Cowsill of the Cowsills appears on backing vocals and plays percussion on the album.

In October 2006, VH1 listed "867-5309/Jenny" as the 36th-greatest song of the 1980s.

Track listing

Side one
"867-5309/Jenny" (Alex Call, Jim Keller) – 3:46
"Baby It's Alright" (Tommy Heath, Keller) – 3:23
"Shadow on the Road Ahead" (Rita Abrams, Heath) – 3:36
"Bernadiah" (Heath, Keller) – 5:29
"Why Baby Why" (Heath, Keller) – 2:58

Side two
"Which Man Are You" (Heath, Keller) – 2:50
"No Way to Cry" (Heath) – 3:07
"Steal Away" (David Gilman, Keller) – 3:50
"Tonight" (Brian Dalton, Heath) – 2:41
"Only One" (Keller) – 3:24
"Not Say Goodbye" (Keller) – 3:26

Personnel
Tommy Heath – lead vocals, rhythm guitar, piano
Jim Keller – lead guitar, vocals
Jon Lyons – bass guitar (tracks A1-5)
Victor Carberry – drums (tracks A1-5)

Additional musicians
Steve LeGassick – keyboards (became an official member of the band by 1982)
Rick Cutler – drums (tracks B1-6)
Lonnie Turner – bass guitar (tracks B1-6)
John Cowsill – percussion, harmony vocals (tracks A1-2)
Sam Clayton – percussion (track A4)

Production
Produced by Chuck Plotkin and Geoff Workman
Engineers: Toby Scott, Geoff Workman
Assistant engineers: Catharina Masters, John Weaver

Charts

Weekly charts

Year-end charts

Singles

References

External links
 

1981 albums
Tommy Tutone albums
Columbia Records albums
CBS Records albums